The Nazi German era lasted from Adolf Hitler's assumption of power on 30 January 1933 to Karl Dönitz's surrender at the end of World War II on 8 May 1945. While not as highly regarded as films of the preceding Weimar Republic era, the films of Nazi Germany, mainly made under control of Joseph Goebbels, hold a fascination for many, both as historical documents of one of the most important periods of 20th century history, as well as for their own artistic merit. While some of them are popular only within the Neo-Nazi subculture, comedies starring Heinz Rühmann rank among the favourites of all Germans, and the propaganda films of Leni Riefenstahl have been influential, though controversial.

A total of 1,084 feature films were shown in cinemas in Nazi Germany.

1933 
Note: This year includes films released during both the Weimar and Nazi eras

1934

1935

1936

1937

1938

1939

1940

1941

1942

1943

1944

1945

Series
Note: These were series of films that, in most cases, spanned multiple years.

Uncompleted or unreleased 
Films that could not be complete or released until after the end of World War II.

References

See also 
 List of Nazi propaganda films
 Nazism and cinema
 Department of Film (Nazi Germany)
 Cinema of Germany
 Reichsfilmarchiv
 Reichsfilmkammer
 List of films set in Berlin
 List of World War II films

1933
 
Germany
Films
Germany
Films
Lists of World War II films